Science of Computer Programming is a peer-reviewed scientific journal covering computer programming. It is published by Elsevier and the editors-in-chief are M.R. Mousavi (King's College London) and A. De Lucia (University of Salerno). The journal was established in 1981.

Abstracting and indexing
The journal is abstracted and indexed in:

According to the Journal Citation Reports, the journal has a 2020 impact factor of 0.863.

References

External links

Computer science journals
Elsevier academic journals
English-language journals
Journals published between 13 and 25 times per year
Publications established in 1981